Inversion is a 2016 Iranian film directed by Behnam Behzadi. It was screened in the Un Certain Regard section at the 2016 Cannes Film Festival.

References

External links
 

2016 films
Iranian drama films
2010s Persian-language films
2016 drama films